Casitas may refer to:

 Casitas Dam, dam on Coyote Creek near Ojai, California
 Lake Casitas, lake in Ventura County, California, formed by Casitas Dam 
 Casitas District, Contralmirante Villar, Peru